Opihi may refer to:

 Cellana, sea snails known as ‘opihi in Hawaiian.
 Opihi, New Zealand
 Opihi River, Canterbury, New Zealand
 Opihi Whanaungakore, a Māori burial ground near Whakatāne, New Zealand